Margaret Ann "Peggy" McCay (November 3, 1927 – October 7, 2018) was an American actress whose career began in 1949, and includes theatre, television, soap operas, and feature films.  McCay may be best known for originating the roles of Vanessa Dale on the CBS soap opera Love of Life (a role she played from 1951 to 1955), and Caroline Brady, which she played from 1983 to 2016 on NBC's Days of Our Lives.

Life and career
McCay was born on November 3, 1927, in Manhattan. She was the only child of Catherine (née Tighe) and Michael Joseph McCay, who owned a construction company that specialized in building schools. McCay attended Saint Walburga's Convent School and Barnard College, graduating from the latter in June 1949. After her father's sudden death, she and her mother ran his construction company for a period of time.

Following her graduation from college, McCay joined impresaria Margo Jones's Texas-based theatre company and graduated to repertory, where she essayed numerous roles. She also studied with Lee Strasberg in New York and later helped to set up Strasberg's West Coast studio. In New York one of her first roles was in a 1956 off-Broadway production of Chekhov's Uncle Vanya, playing opposite Franchot Tone. Her role as Sonya in Uncle Vanya earned her an Obie Award for Best Young Actress of the Year in an off-Broadway production. The next year both she and Tone reprised their respective roles in the Hollywood film version of the play.

McCay accepted her first major role as the heroine Vanessa Dale on the soap opera Love of Life, which premiered in 1951. After four years, she left in 1955 to pursue other options. 

In 1958 she appeared on Gunsmoke as “Flora”, a woman freed from an abusive marriage by the actions of her town drunk father whom she never knew  (played by John Dehner) in “Bottleman” (S3E28). That same year she appeared on Perry Mason as defendant Stephanie Falkner in "The Case of the Long-Legged Models", and in 1959 as fraudster Melissa Maybrook in the Maverick episode "The Sheriff of Duck 'n' Shoot" with James Garner and Jack Kelly. She also appeared as a supporting character in the Maverick episode titled "Kiz" starring Roger Moore and Kathleen Crowley. Soon after, she was cast in an episode of the CBS anthology series, Appointment with Adventure. She appeared in four feature films in the late 1950s before landing a lead role in 1962 in the ABC television series Room for One More as Anna Perrott Rose, who had written a memoir about her family life as a foster mother; Andrew Duggan portrayed the part that Cary Grant had played in the original movie version a decade earlier. In 1962, McCay starred in the feature film Lad, A Dog.

On February 4, 1963, she appeared as Sheriff Andy Taylor's old girlfriend Sharon DeSpain in the "Class Reunion" episode of The Andy Griffith Show. On April 9, 1963, McCay appeared in the episode "Broken Honor" of NBC's Laramie; she and Rod Cameron played Martha and Roy Halloran, a farm couple. 

McCay guest-starred on ABC's The Roaring 20s, The Greatest Show on Earth, and Jason Evers's Channing. In 1963, she appeared on NBC's Redigo, with Richard Egan, and on CBS's Perry Mason (as defendant Margaret Layton in "The Case of the Skeleton's Closet"). In 1963 she was in an episode of The Virginian as Helen Hammond Judson, a woman seeking her husband. In 1964, after guest starring in The Fugitive, she returned to daytime television as a lead on ABC's The Young Marrieds. When the show went off the air in 1966, she was written into the story line on ABC's General Hospital (as Iris Fairchild) until 1970. In the 1970s, McCay appeared in Eleanor and Franklin: The White House Years, How the West Was Won, The Lazarus Syndrome and Barnaby Jones (episode titled, "Blind Terror"). She appeared in a 1975 television movie, John O'Hara's Gibbsville (also known as The Turning Point of Jim Malloy), and was a regular in the cast of the short-lived 1976 series Gibbsville. During the late 1970s and early 1980s, she had a recurring role as Marion Hume in the CBS drama Lou Grant. In 1991, McCay was awarded a Primetime Emmy for Outstanding Guest Actress in a Drama Series for The Trials of Rosie O'Neill.

She may be best known as matriarch Caroline Brady on Days of Our Lives. McCay first appeared on the program in February 1983. After signing a long-term contract in 1985, she played the character of Caroline on a regular basis for over thirty years. Her final appearance in the role was aired August 24, 2016.

Death
On October 7, 2018, McCay died from natural causes at her home in Los Angeles. She never married or had children, leaving no immediate survivors.

Awards and nominations

Feature films
 Lad A Dog (1962)
 Promises in the Dark (1979)
 Bustin' Loose (1981)
 Second Thoughts (1983)
 Daddy's Girl (1996)
 James Dean (2001)

References

  26. Demetria Fulton previewed Peggy McCay's appearance in the second season of Barnaby Jones; episode titled, "Blind Terror"(09/16/1973).

Further reading

External links
 
 
 
 

1927 births
2018 deaths
Actresses from New York City
American film actresses
American soap opera actresses
American television actresses
American stage actresses
Barnard College alumni
Emmy Award winners
Obie Award recipients
People from Manhattan
20th-century American actresses
21st-century American actresses